The Big Idea is a 1917 American short comedy film starring Harold Lloyd.  The film has been preserved and is available online.

Plot
Harold, Snub and Bebe are employees at a pawn shop that is having trouble attracting customers.  The boss informs Bebe that business is so slow that he will have to let her go.  Both Harold and Snub are smitten by Bebe.  Harold comes up with a clever way to save Bebe's job.  He circulates a fake telegram stating there is an item in the pawn shop marked with a double X that contains $10,000.  Harold proceeds to mark numerous items in the shop with the double X and makes sure that several people on the street accidentally see the bogus telegram.  Very soon the hopeful customers come into the antique store and buy almost everything on the floor.  The happy proprietor rehires Bebe.  She and Snub see the phony telegram too.  Snub sees the only unsold item left in the shop—a large vase—has a double X on it and buys it.  Snub eagerly buys the vase before Harold can tell him about the ruse.  Snub angrily smashes the vase—and finds a large sack containing $10,000.  Snub and Bebe happily leave the antique shop arm in arm with the huge amount of money.

Cast
 Harold Lloyd 
 Snub Pollard 
 Bebe Daniels 
 William Blaisdell
 Sammy Brooks
 Lige Conley (credited as Lige Cromley)
 Billy Fay
 William Gillespie
 Gus Leonard
 Norman Napier
 Fred C. Newmeyer
 Dorothea Wolbert

Reception
Like many American films of the time, The Big Idea was subject to cuts by city and state film censorship boards. For example, the Chicago Board of Censors required a cut of a closeup of hands holding U.S. currency.

See also
 List of American films of 1917
 Harold Lloyd filmography

References

External links

The Big Idea (full film) on Vimeo.

1917 films
1917 comedy films
1917 short films
Silent American comedy films
American silent short films
American black-and-white films
Films directed by Gilbert Pratt
American comedy short films
1910s American films